Homespun is a demo album by XTC. It was released by Cooking Vinyl and Idea Records. A companion to Apple Venus Volume 1, it has the same running order as its parent album. It was reissued in 2005 as a part of Apple Box.

Track listing

CD: COOKCD 188 
All songs written by Andy Partridge, except where noted.
"River of Orchids" – 4:10
"I'd Like That" – 4:47
"Easter Theatre" – 4:52
"Knights in Shining Karma" – 3:38
"Frivolous Tonight" (Colin Moulding) – 3:06
"Greenman" – 6:01
"Your Dictionary" – 3:14
"Fruit Nut" (Moulding) – 2:44
"I Can't Own Her" – 5:06
"Harvest Festival" – 5:17
"The Last Balloon" – 5:17

Personnel
XTC
Colin Moulding
Andy Partridge

References

1999 albums
Cooking Vinyl albums
Idea Records albums
XTC albums
Demo albums